Aliabad-e  Keshmar  is a village in Kenarshahr Rural District, in the Central District of Bardaskan County, Razavi Khorasan Province, Iran. At the 2006 census, its population was 633, in 191 families.

References 

Populated places in Bardaskan County